Pierfrancesco Diliberto, nicknamed Pif (born 1972), is an Italian television host, film director, actor and writer.

Biography and career
Pif was born in Palermo, Italy on 4 June 1972. He is the son of the Italian director Maurizio Diliberto and has had a passion for cinema since his youth.

In 1998 he worked as assistant director to Marco Tullio Giordana for I cento passi (The Hundred Steps), a famous film against the mafia. In the same year he started working as a television author at Mediaset. In 2001 he started participating in Le Iene (The Hyenas), an Italian TV show with journalistic reporting characterized by a sharp satirical style.

In 2007 he started his own TV show, Il Testimone (The Witness), on MTV. In the show, he uses an Autovox to create amateur-like reports in Italy and abroad. In the same year he published his book Piffettopoli. Le fatiche di un quasi vip.

In 2012 he published the short story Sarà stata una fuga di gas (It Must Have Been a Gas Leak) in the book Dove eravamo. Vent'anni dopo Capaci e Via D'Amelio (Where We Were. Twenty Years After Capaci and Via D'Amelio), a miscellaneous volume commemorating the twentieth anniversary of the death of Giovanni Falcone and Paolo Borsellino, two famous Sicilian judges who fought against the mafia and, after being assassinated, became symbols of the fight against the mafia in Italy.

In 2013 he started his film career by writing and directing The Mafia Kills Only in the Summer, in which he also plays the leading role, and from which he created the homonym TV series, directed by Luca Ribuoli. In 2016 at the Rome Film Festival his second film as director : In guerra per amore.

Filmography

As a director

As a screenwriter

As an actor

As himself

References

External links

1972 births
Mass media people from Palermo
Italian film directors
Italian television presenters
Italian male film actors
Italian television writers
Italian people of Danish descent
Living people
Male television writers